Punta Palau Lighthouse is an active lighthouse located on the northern extremity of a granite promontory where, shaped by time, appears a natural sculpture that looks like a bear, symbol of Palau in front of the Maddalena archipelago on the Tyrrhenian Sea.

Description
The tower and the lantern are painted white, the balcony in green and the lantern dome in grey metallic. The lighthouse is completely automated, powered by a solar unit and managed by the Marina Militare with the identification code number 1034 E.F.

See also
 List of lighthouses in Italy

References

External links
 Servizio Fari Marina Militare

Lighthouses in Italy
Buildings and structures in the Province of Sassari
Lighthouses completed in 1935
1935 establishments in Italy